George Watson Sr. was a supply sergeant and support personnel for the Tuskegee Airmen, the 332nd Fighter Group.  He served in the U.S. Army Air Forces during World War II.
Mr. Watson was sent to Italy in 1944 and served as a supply sergeant.
On March 29, 2007, Watson attended a ceremony in the U.S. Capitol rotunda, where the surviving veterans of the Tuskegee Airmen (and their widows) were awarded the Congressional Gold Medal in recognition of their service.

References

African-American United States Army personnel
United States Army personnel of World War II
Tuskegee University
Military personnel from Tuskegee, Alabama
United States Army Air Forces soldiers
1920 births
2017 deaths
United States Army Air Forces personnel of World War II
21st-century African-American people
African Americans in World War II